Ronald Francis Arias (born November 30, 1941) is an American former senior writer and correspondent for People magazine and People en Español. He is also a highly regarded author whose novel The Road to Tamazunchale has been recognized as a milestone in Mexican-American literature.

About Arias' most recent work of fiction, The Wetback and Other Stories (2016), author Paul Theroux writes, "I felt reading these wonderful stories that I was admitted to an adjacent neighborhood, a rich culture that is another world—call it Amexica—both mysterious and magical, that is persuasive through its tenderness. My hope is that Ron Arias continues to write short stories that tell us who we are."

Early life
A Los Angeles native, Arias spent his early years in a neighborhood located between the Los Angeles River and Elysian Park known as Frog Town or Elysian Valley, the allegorical setting for much of his fictional work.

Career

Journalism
Arias' journalism career began in 1962 in Argentina working for the English-language daily newspaper, Buenos Aires Herald. Later, he became a Peace Corps volunteer near Cusco, Peru, contributing to the Christian Science Monitor an eyewitness account of a massacre of farmers by government troops. He also worked for a year on the Daily Journal in Caracas, Venezuela, thereafter publishing as a freelancer to various publications, including The Nation, the Los Angeles Times, Hispanic Link, and Nuestro magazine.

In 1985 Arias began work as a People magazine senior writer with a global beat. His feature byline stories focused on all manner of people in war, famine, hurricanes, earthquakes and other calamities.

Of his time as the magazine's parachute journalist, Arias has said, "On every continent, I covered five wars, famine, earthquakes, hurricanes, all kinds of disasters in Haiti, Somalia, Ethiopia, Australia, Vietnam, Moscow, you name it." His first major disaster article was the 1985 Mexico City earthquake, which he was assigned simply because he was the only staff member fluent in Spanish.

Literary work
Arias' work is influenced by twentieth-century Latin American literature and he has been called "a post-modernist who integrates in his fiction a keen eye for actual Mexican-American experience."

The Road to Tamazunchale
Arias' best known work is the novel The Road to Tamazunchale, for which numerous critical studies exist. The Road to Tamazunchale depicts the last days of Fausto Tejada, an old widower being cared for by his teenage niece in Los Angeles and occasionally visited by the spirit of his dead wife. Fausto spends his final days in a number of fantastic scenarios that suggest magic realism.

Tamazunchale, while a real place, serves here as a metaphorical place, a magical place where wishes come true but that can never really be reached; the real town is never shown in the novel, but is used in the fantastical play that Fausto and his neighbors create called "The Road to Tamazunchale". The novel radically breaks with the tradition of Chicano literature that focuses on learning to understand reality, constructing a Chicano version of history and bringing order to the world. Instead, Arias' protagonist is more a creator of worlds than an interpreter of them.

Chicano Literature: A Reference Guide'''s entry for Arias describes The Road to Tamazunchale as a breakthrough work of Chicano fiction:  

A feature film adaptation of The Road to Tamazunchale entitled Fausto's Road is in the works.

The Wetback and Other Stories
According to Arias himself, The Wetback and Other Stories, a collection of short stories inspired by the Mexican-American denizens of the Elysian Valley of his youth, is an attempt to "bridge the white world and the darker Spanish-speaking world": 

Personal life
While a student at UCLA, Arias met and quickly married his wife Joan, then working towards her doctorate in Hispanic languages and literature. Their only son is filmmaker Michael Arias, currently residing in Tokyo, Japan.

Arias is an accomplished potter (retiring from People having ignited a previously dormant passion for the fine arts).

Awards and honors
1975 National Book Award, nominee, The Road to Tamazunchale 
1975 University of California, Irvine, Chicano/Latino Literary Prize, first prize, The Wetback 
2003 Latino Literary Hall of Fame Award, best biography, Moving Target2004 Los Angeles Press Club Award for wire service/daily or weekly newspaper bureau, People magazine's coverage of the Laci Peterson murder
2016 Peace Corps Award, The Wetback and Other StoriesList of works
FictionThe Road to Tamazunchale (1975) — Arias' seminal novel about the fantastical journeys of an old man approaching death, National Book Award nominee.The Wetback and Other Stories (2016) — a collection of short fiction about the Mexican-American inhabitants of Los Angeles' Elysian Valley neighborhood.

Non-fictionFive Against the Sea (1988) — survival tale of five men who survived 142 days drifting at seaHealing from the Heart (1988) with Dr. Mehmet Oz — famed surgeon Mehmet Oz relates his experiences combining modern and traditional medical therapiesMoving Target: A Memoir of Pursuit (2002) — Arias' childhood recollections and the search for his POW father,  Latino Literary Hall of Fame Award recipientWhite's Rules: Saving Our Youth One Kid at a Time (2007) with Paul D. White — story of a Canoga Park school teacher's response to the killing of a studentMy Life as a Pencil (2015) — a collection of essays about Arias' travels as a journalist

Notable articles
 "Red agitation Peru Indians stirred", Christian Science Monitor (October 5, 1965) as Ronald Arias — Peru government crackdown on an indigenous guerrilla uprising
 "The Rooster That Called Me Home", The Nation (June 18, 1983)
 "Sorrow and Strength Amid the Ruins", People (October 7, 1985) — Arias' reporting of the 1985 Mexico City earthquake
 "Red Wine, Hemingway and Me", People (October 14, 1985) — a chance encounter between Ernest Hemingway and a young Arias in Pamplona, Spain
 "Against All Odds", People (October 26, 1987) — profiles of three children thriving despite hardship
 "A Trip to the Edge", People (July 11, 1988) — source for Arias' book Five Against the Sea "Jane Goodall", People (May 4, 1990) — profile of the world's foremost expert on chimps in the wild
 "Heaps of Pain," Who (January 4, 1992)
 "From Inca to Inka Kola", Going Up Country: Travel Essays by Peace Corps Writers (1994) — Arias' travels in Peru as a Peace Corps volunteer
 "Snakes," Brevity: A Journal of Concise Literary Non-fiction Issue 31 (September 25, 2009) — jogging in Managua with Daniel Ortega

Bilbiographical Resources
https://faculty.ucmerced.edu/mmartin-rodriguez/index_files/vhAriasRon.htm

See also

Chicanismo
List of Mexican American writers
Latin American literature
Post-modernism

References

Further reading
Bruce-Novoa, Juan; "Interview with Ron Arias"  Journal of Ethnic Studies, 1976 Winter; 3 (4): 69-73.
Martinez, Eliud; "Ron Arias' The Road to Tamazunchale: Novel of the New Reality"  Latin American Literary Review, 1977; 10: 51-63.
Gingerich, Willard. "Aspects of Prose Style in Three Chicano Novels: Pocho, Bless Me, Ultima, and The Road to Tamazunchale"  pp. 206–228 IN: Ornstein-Galicia, Jacob (ed.); Metcalf, Allan (bibliog.); Form and Function in Chicano English. Rowley, MA: Newbury House; 1984.
Nieto, Eva Margarita. "The Dialectics of Textual Interpolation in Ron Arias' The Road to Tamazunchale" pp. 239–246 IN: Lattin, Vernon E. (ed.); Contemporary Chicano Fiction: A Critical Survey. Binghamton, NY: Bilingual; 1986.
Lerat, Christian. "Ultime va-et-vient entre l'ici et l'ailleurs dans The Road to Tamazunchale" pp. 189–202 IN: Béranger, Jean (ed.); L'Ici et l'ailleurs: Multilinguisme et multiculturalisme en Amérique du Nord. Bordeaux: Presses de l'Université de Bordeaux; 1991.
Fabre, Geneviève; "Leave-Taking and Retrieving in The Road to Tamazunchale and The Ultraviolet Sky"  The Bilingual Review/La Revista Bilingüe, 1991 May-Dec; 16 (2-3): 171-79.
Herrera, Andrea O'Reilly; "Ron Arias' The Road to Tamazunchale and the Idea of Death"  The Americas Review: A Review of Hispanic Literature and Art of the USA, 1994 Fall-Winter; 22 (3-4): 114-24.
Martín-Rodríguez, Manuel M. "Border Crisscrossing: The (Long and Winding) Road to Tamazunchale". pp. 181–206 IN: Hawley, John C. (ed. and introd.); Cross-Addressing: Resistance Literature and Cultural Borders''. Albany, NY: State U of New York P; 1996.

External links
Peace Corps Online (accessed March 2008)
UCLA bio (accessed March 2008)

American writers of Mexican descent
20th-century American novelists
20th-century American male writers
Living people
1941 births
University of Barcelona alumni
University of California, Los Angeles alumni
American magazine journalists
Hispanic and Latino American novelists
Hispanic and Latino American journalists
21st-century American novelists
American male novelists
21st-century American male writers
20th-century American non-fiction writers
21st-century American non-fiction writers
American male non-fiction writers